Aubigny-Les Clouzeaux is a commune in the department of Vendée, western France. The municipality was established on 1 January 2016 by merger of the former communes of Aubigny and Les Clouzeaux.

Population

See also 
Communes of the Vendée department

References 

Communes of Vendée
Populated places established in 2016
2016 establishments in France
States and territories established in 2016